Horváth Olivér Milán (born 18 July 2000) is a Hungarian footballer currently playing as a winger for Budafok.

Career
On 1 September 2020, Horváth returned to Hungary from the Netherlands, where he signed with MTK Budapest FC. However, due to the rules, he couldn't be registered for MTK and for that reason, he was immediately loaned out to Szombathelyi Haladás for the 2020–21 season.

In February 2021, he moved to Győri ETO FC. Five months later, in July 2021, Horváth joined III. Kerületi TVE.

Career statistics

Club

Notes

References

2000 births
Footballers from Budapest
Living people
Hungarian footballers
Hungary youth international footballers
Association football forwards
Ferencvárosi TC footballers
MTK Budapest FC players
AFC Ajax players
PSV Eindhoven players
Jong PSV players
Szombathelyi Haladás footballers
Győri ETO FC players
III. Kerületi TUE footballers
Budafoki LC footballers
Eerste Divisie players
Nemzeti Bajnokság II players
Hungarian expatriate footballers
Hungarian expatriate sportspeople in the Netherlands
Expatriate footballers in the Netherlands